Aeromachus jhora is a species of skipper butterfly found in Asia (Vietnam and Assam to Malaya)

Description

References

j
Butterflies of Asia
Taxa named by Lionel de Nicéville
Butterflies described in 1885